Saltese or Seltice can refer to:

 Saltese, Montana
 Saltese Mountain, a mountain in Mineral County, Montana
 Saltese Uplands, shrub-steppe conservation area in Spokane County, Washington
 Saltese Flats, wetland in Spokane County, Washington
 Saltese Creek, creek that runs through the Saltese Flats
 Chief Andrew Seltice, Coeur d'Alene chief who sold the land to create Post Falls, Idaho